The 1965 New Zealand bravery awards were announced via two special honours lists dated 20 April and 23 September 1965, and recognised two men for their actions when three boys were trapped in a water main tunnel in the Wellington suburb of Khandallah in June 1964. Further bravery awards were also included in that year's New Year and Queen's Birthday Honours.

British Empire Medal (BEM)
Civil division, for gallantry
 David Bryan John Painter – constable, New Zealand Police; of Wellington.

Queen's Commendation for Brave Conduct
 Donald William Jones – of Linden

References

Bravery
Bravery awards
New Zealand bravery awards